Vilayattu Aarambam is a 2017 Indian Tamil-language action thriller film directed by Vijay R Anand and AR Suriyan and starring Yuvan and Shravya. The film is based on a true story regarding the collapse of a MLM company.

Plot 
Yuvan is a youth who hangs out with his four friends: Shah Rukh Khan, a man living thirty years in the past; Vijay, a basketball player; Amitabh Rajkamal; and Anand, a moneylender. He falls in love with a girl named Anjana and has a grudge against her brother Arjun Prabhakar, a police officer. Arjun warns Yuvan not to fall in love with Anjana, but he does so anyway. As a mark of revenge, Arjun gets involved in a scam involving an MLM company and puts the blame on Yuvan. How Yuvan comes out of this problem and reunites with Anjana forms the rest of the story.

Cast 
Yuvan as Yuvan
Shravya as Anjana
Srinivasan as Shah Rukh Khan
Riyaz Khan as Arjun Prabhakar
Bhanu Chander as Emcee
Feroz Khan as Lawyer

Production 
Yuvan was signed to play an unemployed IT worker in a film directed by the duo  Vijay R Anand and AR Suriyan. The film is based on a true story regarding the collapse of a MLM company. Riyaz Khan was brought to portray the antagonist.

Soundtrack 
The songs were composed by Srikanth Deva.

Release 
After a run in Tamil Nadu, the film released in Kerala a few weeks after release. Maalai Malar wrote that the directors Suriyaan and Vijay R Anand had come up with a film to says that there is a widespread rumour that various scams are taking place in a company, which would bring in good income and thus eliminate unemployment in the country. Critic Malini Mannath wrote, "If there is any positive in the film, it’s that the directors have confined their story-telling to just about 120 minutes."

References

External links 

2010s Tamil-language films
2017 action thriller films
Action films based on actual events
Indian action thriller films
Indian films based on actual events
Thriller films based on actual events